Kang Hyounghwa (born 1963) is a South Korean professor of Korean language and literature at Yonsei University served as the 2nd President - and the first woman President - of King Sejong Institute Foundation responsible for operating King Sejong Institutes and developing their programmes from 2018 to 2021.

Kang had served as a member of the Korean Language Deliberation Council at Ministry of Culture, Sports and Tourism from 2011 to 2015 responsible for planning Korean language education, preserving the Korean language and updating its system and grammar mandated by the Framework Act on National Language.

In 1999 Kang was one of the first professors to join the first-ever department specialised in Korean language education for foreigners, Kyung Hee University's Department of Korean language. She later led as its Dean from 2003 to 2007. In 2010 Kang moved to her alma mater and continued teaching as a professor.

Kang has been active in academia in areas of Korean language education as summarised as below.

 The Korean Association for Lexicography
 Vice President from 2015 to 2018 
 Director for editing from 2009 to 2014
 The Korea Association of Foreign Languages Education
 Vice President from 2017 to 2018
 Member of Editorial Board 
 Korean Language and Literature Society 
 Vice President from 2017 to 2018
 Member of Editorial Board from 2019 
 The Korean Language Culture Education Society
 President from 2015 to 2017
 Advisor from 2019
 Korea Grammar Education Circle
 Founding member in 2004
 Director for recruitment from 2004 to 2010
 Director for research from 2010 to 2012
 Member of Editorial Board from 2010 to 2014
 Vice President from 2012 to 2018
 Chair of Editorial Board from 2016 to 2018
 President from 2018 to 2019
 Advisor from 2020
 The Applied Linguistics Association of Korea 
 Director for Editing from 2007 to 2009
 The Korean Society Of Bilingualism
 Director for Editing from 2007 to 2009
 The National Language Deliberation Council, Ministry of Culture, Sports and Tourism

Kang holds three degrees - from a bachelor to a doctorate - in Korean language and literature from Yonsei University.

References 

Living people
1963 births
Academic staff of Yonsei University
Yonsei University alumni
Academic staff of Kyung Hee University
South Korean women academics
Korean-language education
South Korean government officials